The 2022 British Athletics Championships was the national championships in outdoor track and field for athletes in the United Kingdom, which also served as a qualifying event for the 2022 World Athletics Championships.

Background
The 2022 British Athletics Championships were held from the 24–24 June 2022 at the Manchester Regional Arena. The event was used to determine British qualifiers for the 2022 World Athletics Championships. The Championships were broadcast on the BBC Sport website.

The British title for the 10,000 metres event was held in May 2022 at the Night of the 10,000m PBs event. The women's race was won by Jessica Judd, who qualified for the World Championships as a result. The men's competition was won by Italian Yeman Crippa, with Sam Atkin as the highest finishing Briton, and thus the British title winner.

Highlights

Daryll Neita won the women's 100 and 200 metres events, the first time since 2010 that a woman had won both races at the same British Athletics Championships. Neita missed the qualifying time for the 200 metres event at the 2022 World Athletics Championships by 0.01 seconds; her times at these Championships were excluded from the qualification criteria as both races had a large tail wind. Jeremiah Azu won the men's 100 metres event, and both Neita and Azu's victories were considered upsets, as Dina Asher-Smith and Reece Prescod were considered the favourites for the events. Nethaneel Mitchell-Blake won the men's 200 metres event in a championship record time of 20.05 seconds. Victoria Ohuruogu, the sister of former Olympic gold medallist Christine, won the 400 metres event. Matthew Hudson-Smith won the men's 400 metres race in a British Championships record time of 44.92 seconds. Tade Ojora won the men's 110 metres hurdles event for the second consecutive year, but also missed out on qualifying for the World Championships due to a large tail wind.

In the field events, Holly Bradshaw won her tenth pole vault championship. Charlotte Payne won the hammer throw event with the third best throw by a British woman in history. Jade Lally won her eighth British discus throw title, and Lorraine Ugen won her fifth British long jump title. Elliot Thompson, the son of Daley Thompson, won the decathlon event. It was his first British title.

The 400 metres wheelchair events were won by Nathan Maguire and Hannah Cockroft respectively. Melanie Woods and Eden Rainbow-Cooper finished second and third respectively in the women's race.

Results

Men

Women

Parasports – Men

Parasports – Women

Notes

References

2022
British Outdoor Championships
Athletics Outdoor
Athletics Championships
Sports competitions in Manchester